The 1986 Trans America Athletic Conference baseball tournament was held at Hunter Field on the campus of Hardin–Simmons in Abilene, Texas, on April 25 and 26. This was the eighth tournament championship held by the Trans America Athletic Conference, in its eighth year of existence.  won their third tournament championship.

Format and seeding 
The winner of each of the conference's two divisions met in a best of three series. Stetson was ineligible as a new member of the conference.

Bracket

All-Tournament Team 
The following players were named to the All-Tournament Team.

Most Valuable Player 
Mike Shepherd was named Tournament Most Valuable Player. Shepherd was an outfielder for Georgia Southern.

References 

Tournament
ASUN Conference Baseball Tournament
Trans America Athletic Conference baseball tournament
Trans America Athletic Conference baseball tournament
Baseball in Abilene, Texas